The Deragon Cave is the deepest cave in Khorasan, located in South Khorasan, Iran near Sarayan.

Caves of Iran
Landforms of South Khorasan Province